Douglas Duer (October 4, 1887 – 1964) was a painter and illustrator in the United States. He studied with William Merritt Chase and Howard Pyle. Duer worked for various newspapers, illustrated books, did Works Progress Administration assignments during the Great Depression, and created artwork for greeting cards.

Publications with stories he illustrated include Scribners, Harper's, Everybody's Magazine, The American Magazine and Boy's Life.

He exhibited in Wilmington, Delaware in 1917.

Some of his poetry was published.

Work as illustrator
Told in the Hills (1891) by Marah Ellis Ryan
Desert Gold (novel) by Zane Grey
The Wilderness Trail by Frank Williams
Riders of the Purple Sage by Zane Grey
Keep the Wagons Moving by West Lathrop, pseudonym for Dorothy West Lathrop
A siren of the snows by Stanley Shaw
Two Arabian Knights by Donald McGibeny
Lizette by Samuel Raphaelson in Everybody's Magazine
The Great White Wall: A Narrative Poem by William Rose Benét
The Vanished World by Douglas Duer, Sherman, French & Co. (1916)
Frontispiece of The Single Track by Douglas Grant (author).
Walter Reed: Doctor in Uniform by L.N. Wood

References

External links
 
 

1887 births
1964 deaths
20th-century American painters
American magazine illustrators
20th-century American poets
American male poets
20th-century American male writers